Kyokunankai Hiromitsu (born 14 December 1977 as Hirokazu Ken) is a former sumo wrestler from Amagi, Kagoshima, Japan. He made his professional debut in March 1993 and reached the top division in September 2010. The 17 years it took him to reach the top division is the second slowest progress ever, in the history of professional sumo wrestling. His highest rank was maegashira 16. He was forced to retire by the Japan Sumo Association, as a result of the 2011 match-fixing scandal.

Career
He joined Oshima stable from junior high school, having met in 1992 a wrestler at the stable, Kyokudōzan, who was from the nearby town of Tokunoshima. He made his professional debut in March 1993, fighting under his real surname of Ken. In May 1995 he adopted a formal shikona of Kyokunankai. It took him another six years to win his first yusho or tournament championship in the division, which came in March 2005 with a 6–1 record. After another 6–1 record in the following tournament in May he finally became a sekitori and was promoted to the jūryō division. In March 2006 he scored ten wins in a tournament for the first time and reached a new highest rank of jūryō 2, but reaching the top division still proved beyond him as he could score only 4–11 in the following tournament. After some mediocre results he fell back to the makushita division in January 2008 but made an immediate return to jūryō after just one tournament's absence. 

In July 2010 he earned promotion to the top makuuchi division for the first time. His record of 10–5 at the low rank of jūryō 12 would not under normal circumstances have been enough to win promotion, but due to six makuuchi wrestlers (Toyonoshima, Miyabiyama, Toyohibiki, Goeido, Okinoumi and Wakakoyu) being suspended from the tournament because of a baseball betting scandal and being demoted, there were a large number of vacancies on the banzuke for the Sumo Association to fill. It had taken Kyokunankai 105 tournaments from his professional debut to reach the top division, which is the second slowest in sumo history after fellow Kagoshima Prefecture native Hoshiiwato. Kyokunankai scored only four wins against eleven losses in his makuuchi debut from the rank of maegashira 16, and was demoted back to jūryō.

Retirement from sumo
Kyokunankai last competed on the dohyo in the January 2011 tournament. Following this tournament he was one of 22 wrestlers identified after an investigation by the Sumo Association as being guilty of match-fixing and was ordered to retire. Kyokunankai denied involvement but nonetheless handed in his retirement papers on April 5, 2011 (ensuring that he would retain his retirement benefits and avoid being formally expelled). On April 28 he was invited by Antonio Inoki of the IGF professional wrestling organization to visit the GENOME 15 event, but he decided not to participate, declaring that he would move to his wife's parents home in Fukuoka.

Fighting style
Kyokunankai was a yotsu-sumo wrestler, preferring grappling techniques to pushing or thrusting. His favoured grip on his opponent's mawashi was hidari-yotsu, a right hand outside, left hand inside position. His most common winning kimarite was yori-kiri, a straightforward force out.

Career record

See also
Glossary of sumo terms
List of past sumo wrestlers

References

External links

1977 births
Living people
Japanese sumo wrestlers
Sumo people from Kagoshima Prefecture
People from the Amami Islands
Sportspeople banned for life